Laccobius is a genus of water scavenger beetles in the family Hydrophilidae. There are more than 80 described species in Laccobius.

Species
These 81 species belong to the genus Laccobius:

 Hydroxenus subpictus Wollaston, 1867
 Laccobius agilis (Randall, 1838)
 Laccobius albescens Rottenberg, 1874
 Laccobius algiricus Hansen, 1999
 Laccobius alternus Motschulsky, 1855
 Laccobius antillensis Spangler, 1968
 Laccobius arenarius Cheary, 1971
 Laccobius atricolor d'Orchymont, 1938
 Laccobius atrocephalus Reitter, 1872
 Laccobius bipunctatus (Fabricius, 1775)
 Laccobius borealis Cheary, 1971
 Laccobius bruesi Cheary, 1971
 Laccobius californicus Orchymont, 1942
 Laccobius carri Orchymont, 1942
 Laccobius cinereus Motschulsky, 1860
 Laccobius colon (Stephens, 1829)
 Laccobius curvipes Régimbart, 1903
 Laccobius decorus (Gyllenhal, 1827)
 Laccobius elegans Gentili, 1979
 Laccobius ellipticus LeConte, 1855
 Laccobius elongatus Scudder, 1878
 Laccobius exspectans Gentili
 Laccobius femoralis Rey, 1885
 Laccobius flachii Lomnicki, 1894
 Laccobius flavosplendens Endrödy-Younga, 1967
 Laccobius florens Gentili, 1979
 Laccobius formosus Gentili, 1979
 Laccobius fragilis Nakane, 1966
 Laccobius fuscipunctatus Hilsenhoff, 1995
 Laccobius gloriana Gentili & Ribera, 1998
 Laccobius gracilis Motschulsky, 1855
 Laccobius hainanensis
 Laccobius hammondi Gentili, 1984
 Laccobius hardyi Cheary, 1971
 Laccobius hingstoni Orchymont, 1926
 Laccobius hintoni Orchymont, 1942
 Laccobius hispanicus Gentili, 1974
 Laccobius inopinus Gentili
 Laccobius insolitus Orchymont, 1942
 Laccobius leechi Cheary, 1971
 Laccobius leopardus
 Laccobius leucaspis Kiesenwetter, 1870
 Laccobius manalicus Short & Fikácek, 2011
 Laccobius martini
 Laccobius mexicanus Orchymont, 1942
 Laccobius minutoides Orchymont, 1942
 Laccobius minutus (Linnaeus, 1758)
 Laccobius moraguesi Régimbart, 1898
 Laccobius neapolitanus Rottenberg, 1874
 Laccobius nepalensis Gentili, 1982
 Laccobius nevadensis Miller, 1965
 Laccobius nitidus Gentili, 1984
 Laccobius occidentalis Cheary, 1971
 Laccobius oregonensis Cheary, 1971
 Laccobius orsenigoi Gentili
 Laccobius pallidissimus Reitter, 1899
 Laccobius philipinus Gentili, 2005
 Laccobius piceus Fall, 1922
 Laccobius politus Gentili, 1979
 Laccobius priscus Oustalet, 1870
 Laccobius qinlingensis
 Laccobius quilingensis
 Laccobius reflexipenis Cheary, 1971
 Laccobius revelierei Perris, 1864
 Laccobius sculptus d'Orchymont, 1935
 Laccobius scutellaris Motschulsky, 1855
 Laccobius simulans Orchymont, 1923
 Laccobius simulatrix d'Orchymont, 1932
 Laccobius sinuatus Motschulsky, 1849
 Laccobius spangleri Cheary, 1971
 Laccobius striatulus (Fabricius, 1801)
 Laccobius sublaevis J.Sahlberg, 1900
 Laccobius syriacus Guillebeau, 1896
 Laccobius teneralis Cheary, 1971
 Laccobius thermarius Tournier, 1878
 Laccobius truncatipennis Miller, 1965
 Laccobius uhligi Gentili, 1995
 Laccobius varius Gentili, 1975
 Laccobius vetustus Oustalet, 1874
 Laccobius wewalkai
 Laccobius yinziweii Zhang & Jia, 2017

References

Further reading

External links

 

Hydrophilinae
Articles created by Qbugbot